Kevin Andre Jackson (born November 25, 1964 in Highland Falls, New York) is an American retired freestyle and folkstyle wrestler, and mixed martial artist. Following his competitive career, Jackson would become a wrestling coach.

During his international career, Jackson became an Olympic Gold medalist in 1992, a two-time World Champion (1991 and 1995), a three-time World Cup Gold medalist (1993, 1995 and 1997, bronze in 1994) a two-time Pan American Games Gold medalist (1991 and 1995) and a two-time Pan American Champion (1990 and 1991). In folkstyle, Jackson was a four-time NCAA Division I All-American, thrice for the LSU Tigers and once for the Iowa State Cyclones, after Louisiana State University dropped its wrestling program. He also stepped into the UFC Octagon in four occasions, winning his first two bouts and losing the next two, all finishing via submission. After spending the last four years as USA Wrestling's National Freestyle Developmental Coach, Jackson made the move to Ann Arbor, MI to serve as an Assistant Wrestling Coach for the University of Michigan.

Biography

High school 
The native of Lansing, Michigan, won two state high school championships for Eastern High School before becoming a Junior National Greco-Roman wrestling champion.

College
As a college wrestler, he attended LSU and earned All-America honors three times before the school dropped the sport. He transferred to Iowa State for his senior year and captained the Cyclones’ last NCAA championship team (1987), earning another All-America award with an NCAA runner-up finish and registering a 30-3-1 record.

Career
In 1992 he won a gold medal in wrestling and was invited to join "Team Foxcatcher", but was let go the next year when John du Pont started getting paranoid delusions and did not want anything black in his estate, from cars to horses to people. Soon after, Jackson won two Pan American Games titles and was a member of World Championship teams for the United States in both 1993 and 1995. He won three U.S. National Titles and placed second five times. Jackson also became the first American to win the prestigious Takhti Cup (1998) in Tehran, Iran.
During his post-collegiate competitive career, Jackson also assisted with the Cyclone Wrestling Club (1989–92) and volunteered with the Arizona State (1997) program.

Jackson participated in mixed martial arts in 1997, when he joined the Ultimate Fighting Championship to become only the 2nd Olympic Gold medalist wrestler to step in the octagon, eventually winning the UFC 14 Light Heavyweight tournament. He fought Frank Shamrock for the inaugural UFC Light Heavyweight Championship at UFC Japan, but lost via armbar submission. He retired from MMA competition in 1998 after six fights.

Jackson's success earned him a number of major awards, including the 1995 John Smith Award as National Freestyle Wrestler of the Year, 1992 Amateur Wrestling News Man of the Year and 1991 USA Wrestling and USOC Wrestler of the Year. Jackson is a member of the FILA International Wrestling Hall of Fame, the National Wrestling Hall of Fame (as a Distinguished Member) and the Iowa State University Athletics Hall of Fame. In October of 2019, Jackson was inducted into the LSU Hall of Fame and is the only wrestler to be inducted.

Jackson has worked extensively as a wrestling coach. He was head coach of the Sunkist youth development program, National Freestyle coach for USA Wrestling for eight years (2001–08) and the freestyle wrestling coach for two United States' teams at the Olympics. Jackson was the freestyle coach at the Olympic Training Center and head coach for the U.S. Army team at Fort Carson (1998–2001).

In June 2017 Kevin went back to the Olympic Training Center as a US National Team head development coach.

Mixed martial arts record

|-
| Win
| align=center | 4–2
| Sam Adkins
| Submission (armbar)
| Extreme Challenge 18
| 
| align=center | 1
| align=center | 4:21
| Davenport, Iowa, United States
|
|-
| Loss
| align=center | 3–2
| Jerry Bohlander
| Technical Submission (armbar)
| UFC 16
| 
| align=center | 1
| align=center | 10:23
| Kenner, Louisiana, United States
| 
|-
| Loss
| align=center | 3–1
| Frank Shamrock
| Submission (armbar)
| UFC Japan
| 
| align=center | 1
| align=center | 0:16
| Yokohama, Japan
| 
|-
| Win
| align=center | 3–0
| Tony Fryklund
| Submission (choke)
| rowspan=2|UFC 14
| rowspan=2|
| align=center | 1
| align=center | 0:44
| rowspan=2|Birmingham, Alabama, United States
| 
|-
| Win
| align=center | 2–0
| Todd Butler
| TKO (submission to punches)
| align=center | 1
| align=center | 1:27
|
|-
| Win
| align=center | 1–0
| John Lober
| Submission (arm-triangle choke)
| Extreme Fighting 4
| 
| align=center | 2
| align=center | 1:12
| Des Moines, Iowa, United States
|

Championships and awards
 Ultimate Fighting Championship
 UFC 14 Middleweight tournament winner
 Wrestling Observer Newsletter
 Fight of the Year (1998)  vs. Jerry Bohlander on March 13

References

External links
 
 
 Kevin Jackson at the National Wrestling Hall of Fame Site

1964 births
Living people
American wrestling coaches
Iowa State Cyclones wrestlers
Iowa State Cyclones wrestling coaches
LSU Tigers wrestlers
Wrestlers at the 1992 Summer Olympics
American male sport wrestlers
Olympic gold medalists for the United States in wrestling
Sportspeople from Phoenix, Arizona
J
Mixed martial artists utilizing freestyle wrestling
Mixed martial artists utilizing Greco-Roman wrestling
World Wrestling Championships medalists
Medalists at the 1992 Summer Olympics
Pan American Games gold medalists for the United States
Pan American Games medalists in wrestling
Wrestlers at the 1991 Pan American Games
Wrestlers at the 1995 Pan American Games
Medalists at the 1991 Pan American Games
Medalists at the 1995 Pan American Games
Ultimate Fighting Championship male fighters